Nelson is a town in Madison County, New York, United States.  It is an interior town, located in the southwestern part of the county.  The population was 1,980 at the 2010 census. The town was named after Horatio Nelson, the English naval hero.

History 
The town was formed in 1807 from the Town of Cazenovia, the year after Madison County was established.

The Nelson Welsh Congregational Church was listed on the National Register of Historic Places in 1993.

Geography
US Route 20 passes across the town.

Demographics

As of the census of 2000, there were 1,964 people, 731 households, and 549 families residing in the town.  The population density was 45.6 people per square mile (17.6/km2).  There were 1,020 housing units at an average density of 23.7 per square mile (9.1/km2).  The racial makeup of the town was 98.27% White, 0.20% African American, 0.10% Native American, 0.56% from other races, and 0.87% from two or more races. Hispanic or Latino of any race were 1.22% of the population.

There were 731 households, out of which 38.7% had children under the age of 18 living with them, 64.6% were married couples living together, 6.2% had a female householder with no husband present, and 24.8% were non-families. 18.9% of all households were made up of individuals, and 5.5% had someone living alone who was 65 years of age or older.  The average household size was 2.69 and the average family size was 3.07.

In the town, the population was spread out, with 28.3% under the age of 18, 5.6% from 18 to 24, 29.0% from 25 to 44, 27.5% from 45 to 64, and 9.6% who were 65 years of age or older.  The median age was 38 years. For every 100 females, there were 103.7 males.  For every 100 females age 18 and over, there were 103.6 males.

The median income for a household in the town was $49,022, and the median income for a family was $55,458. Males had a median income of $37,083 versus $24,653 for females. The per capita income for the town was $21,378.  About 2.8% of families and 5.1% of the population were below the poverty line, including 4.9% of those under age 18 and 6.5% of those age 65 or over.

Communities and locations in Nelson 
Bucks Corner – A location in the northeastern part of the town.
Eaton Reservoir – Most of the reservoir is in the Town of Nelson by the eastern town line.
Erieville – A hamlet in the southern part of the town, south of Tuscarora Lake.
Hughs Corner – A location in the northeastern corner of the town.
Nelson – The hamlet of Nelson is on Route 20 in the northwestern part of the town.  It was formerly called "Nelson Flats" and "Skunk Hollow."
Pughs Corner – A location east of Nelson village.
Stoney Pond – A pond located north of Eaton Reservoir.
Tuscarora Lake – A lake in the southern part of the town.

Notable people

 Henry Dexter, sculptor; born in Nelson
 Beezie Madden, Olympic equestrian

References

External links
 Erieville-Nelson Heritage Society's collection on New York Heritage Digital Collections
  Early history of Nelson
 Erieville Community

Syracuse metropolitan area
Towns in Madison County, New York